Caloptilia robustella (commonly known as new oak slender) is a moth of the family Gracillariidae. It is known from all of Europe, except the Balkan Peninsula.

There are multiple generations per year, with adults on wing between April and November.

The larvae feed on Fagus sylvatica and Quercus robur. They mine the leaves of their host plant. The mine starts as a narrow lower-surface epidermal gallery, regularly intersecting itself. Later, the mine becomes full depth. It remains a small mine, either rectangular or (more frequently) a triangle in a vein axle, with frass along the sides. Older larvae leave the mine and continue feeding in a leaf roll. Pupation takes place in a white cocoon.

References

robustella
Moths described in 1972
Moths of Europe